Cophinopoda chinensis is a robber fly. It is an insect of the order Diptera, and has two wings. No subspecies are listed in the Catalogue of Life.

Distribution
Cophinopoda chinensis is found in Japan, South Korea, parts of China, India including the Andaman and Nicobar Islands, Sri Lanka, and Indonesia (Java and Sumatra). In Japanese, it is called  which literally means 'blue-eyed horse-fly'.

Description
It grows to a size of about 20–29 mm. The eyes are an iridescent greenish colour.

Gallery

References

External links 
 

 

Asilidae
Insects described in 1794